Otto Kuchenbecker (16 October 1907 – 14 November 1990) was a German basketball player. He competed in the men's tournament at the 1936 Summer Olympics.

References

External links
 

1907 births
1990 deaths
German men's basketball players
Olympic basketball players of Germany
Basketball players at the 1936 Summer Olympics
People from Demmin
Sportspeople from Mecklenburg-Western Pomerania
20th-century German people